Rangamati Government High School (RGHS) is the first high and one of the ancient schoolin Chittagong Hill Tracts in Bangladesh.This school is located in Reserve Bazar in Rangamati.During the 1971 war, many of its students were killed. The school has created leaders, policy makers and professional people. Both tribal and non-tribal students study in the school. It is co-educational.

Monogram and uniform 
"Gyan-E-Shakti" is the motto of the school, which appears in the monogram. The uniform consists of a white shirt, white trousers, and sneakers for the boys. Girls wear a green skirt and green salwar, with white trouser for seniors.

Headmasters

Class and section system 
The school should have started its program from class 5. There are two shifts: morning and day. Presently all the classes from 5 to 10 are running. There are mainly 2 sections in each of the class in the day shift and morning shift.

Academic bunting and tassel color

Tiffin system 
There is a system for distributing Tiffin at the school during recess. ‘Singara’, ‘Samucha’, ‘Nimki’, banana, bread, sweets, local toasts and other various items, are served as Tiffin. Students pay 75 Taka per month Tiffin fees.

Library 
The school has a library with 5000 academic books. Most of them were bought by coeval sanctioned money during the establishment of the school. Others were bought by annually approved money.

School magazine 
The school magazine Shotabdi was first published in 1897, but has not been published every year since then.
A new school magazine Nirjhor was published in 2013. Now it will be published every year.

Admission 
Admission goes on to class 6 to class 9 with an admission test. In some cases a very small number of students are admitted to other classes.

Notable alumni
 Amit Chakma, President and Vice-Chancellor of the University of Western Ontario, in Canada.
 Birendra Kishore Roaza President of PCJSS, Former MLA of Chittagong Hill Tracts.
 Naba Bikram Kishore Tripura Former Secretary of Ministry of CHT, Former Additional Inspector General of Police.

See also
 Education in Bangladesh

References

Further reading
 

Educational institutions established in 1890
High schools in Bangladesh
1890 establishments in India
Schools in Rangamati Hill District